Ria Kataja (born 15 October 1975, in Tampere) is a Finnish actress.

Career

Kataja studied at the Theatre Academy Helsinki. She was seen in a television series Kotikatu since 2003 and in Taivaan tulet since 2007. She has also appeared in several films, such as Black Ice (2007) and Open Up to Me (2013).

Personal life

Ria Kataja was married to actor Tommi Eronen, and together they have two children. The couple divorced in 2012.

Selected filmography

In films
Paratiisin lapset (1994)
Klassikko (2001)
Nousukausi (2003)
Musta jää (2007)
Vares – Pimeyden tango (2012)
Open Up to Me (2013)
 Family Time (2023)

On television
Kaverille ei jätetä (2001)
Paristo (2002)
Kuumia aaltoja (2003)
Kotikatu (2003–2012)
Akkaa päälle (2006)
Taivaan tulet (2007, 2010)

References

External links

1975 births
Living people
Actresses from Tampere
20th-century Finnish actresses
Finnish film actresses
21st-century Finnish actresses